The Gulf of Penas (Golfo de Penas in Spanish, meaning "gulf of distress") is a body of water located south of the Taitao Peninsula, Chile.

Geography
It is open to the westerly storms of the Pacific Ocean, but it affords entrance to several natural harbours. Among these are the gulfs of Tres Montes and San Esteban and San Quintín, and Tarn Bay at the entrance to Messier Channel. To the south of the gulf lies Guayaneco Archipelago and to the east lies San Javier Island and then the mainland.

History
Spanish explorers and Jesuits that sailed south from Chiloé Archipelago in the 17th and 18th centuries regularly avoided rounding the Taitao Peninsula by entering the gulf after a brief land crossing at the isthmus of Ofqui.

In 1741 HMS Wager, attempting to tack from a lee shore in a storm was wrecked along the coast of what would become known as Wager Island in the SE of the Gulf. Some of the survivors were rescued by Chono cheftain Martín Olleta and his men who took them on board their dalcas to the Spanish settlements of Chiloé Archipelago.

On December 1843 the Chilean schooner Ancud rescued the survivors of the wrecked French ship Fleuris o  the shores of the gulf.

Flora and Fauna
Local wildlife includes South American gray fox, South Andean deer, South American sea lions and marine otters.

The gulf is potentially a habitat for a number of baleen whales, and is speculated to be a wintering/calving ground for the critically endangered population of Southern Right Whale.

See Also
Fjords and channels of Chile
Laguna San Rafael National Park

References

 

Penas
Penas
Penas
Taitao Peninsula